Josiah Thomas may refer to:

Josiah Thomas (cricketer) (1910–1960), Australian cricketer
Josiah Thomas (politician) (1863–1933), Australian miner and politician
Josiah Thomas (priest) (1760–1820), English Archdeacon